Christopher Greaves (born January 8, 1987) is a professional Canadian football offensive lineman free agent of the Canadian Football League (CFL). He was drafted 45th overall by the Winnipeg Blue Bombers as a defensive lineman in the 2010 CFL Draft, but made the switch to offence in training camp. He played CIS football for the Western Mustangs and high school football for St. Francis Xavier Secondary School.

References

External links
BC Lions bio
Winnipeg Blue Bombers bio

1987 births
Living people
Canadian football offensive linemen
Edmonton Elks players
Players of Canadian football from Ontario
Canadian football people from Toronto
Western Mustangs football players
Winnipeg Blue Bombers players
Montreal Alouettes players
BC Lions players